Davidson Day School is a private school located in Davidson, North Carolina.

History
Davidson Day School, formerly Acclaim Academy, was founded in 1999 and originally located at 404 Armour Street in Davidson and rented space from the factory that occupied the building. In 2007, Davidson Day School relocated to its current location, 750 Jetton St.

Arts
Every year, the Davidson Day theatre department hosts a winter and spring production.

Athletics

Davidson Day School has moved from 1A to 2A given the growth in student body size.  The girls varsity soccer team won the school's first team state championship in 2010–2011. After moving up to 2A for the 2011–2012 season, they won the State Championship against defending 2A Champions, Caldwell Academy, in overtime.  The girls soccer team won the state championship again in the 2012–2013 season.

The varsity basketball team were state runners-up in the 2011–2012 season.

The school fielded a varsity football team for the first time in 2011–2012 and won the NC Private Division III State Championship.  The football team competed in the larger Division II in the fall of 2012. They received national attention after Davidson Day junior quarterback Will Grier threw for 837 yards and 10 touchdowns 35 of 42 passes in one game on November 9, 2012, in a 104–80 victory over Harrells Christian Academy.

Notable alumni
  Maya Caldwell, WNBA player
 Hayes Grier, American Internet personality
 Nash Grier, American Internet personality
 Will Grier, NFL quarterback
 John Hunter Nemechek, professional stock car racing driver

References

External links
Davidson Day School website

Educational institutions established in 1999
Private high schools in North Carolina
Schools in Mecklenburg County, North Carolina
Private middle schools in North Carolina
Private elementary schools in North Carolina
1999 establishments in North Carolina